Richard Irvin may refer to:
 Richard Irvin (Illinois politician), mayor of Aurora, Illinois
 Richard Irvin (merchant), Scottish-American merchant and banker
 Richard Irvin (Pennsylvania politician), member of the Pennsylvania House of Representatives

See also
 Dick Irvin, Canadian ice hockey player and coach
 Dick Irvin Jr., his son, sports broadcaster
 Richard Irvine, American art director
 Richard Irving (disambiguation)
 Richard Ervin, chief justice of the Florida Supreme Court